Angus Wilkie Faiumiolemau Timroseavao (born 22 March 1990) is a New Zealand-born rugby union player, currently playing as a Prop for the Chiefs in Super Rugby and Auckland in the Mitre 10 Cup. Taavao was called into New Zealand's international team, the All Blacks, as injury cover in 2018 and has played 14 tests since his international debut. Taavao was a member of New Zealand's squad in the 2019 Rugby World Cup.

Taavao has previously represented the Blues and Taranaki in New Zealand, as well as Northern Suburbs, Sydney and the Waratahs in Australia.

Early life
Although born in New Zealand, Taavao would also have been eligible to play international rugby for Australia through his mother, or for Samoa through his father.

Taavao was schooled at Dilworth School in Auckland, New Zealand.

Career

Early career
Taavao was selected for the New Zealand U20 side for the 2010 tournament in Argentina, where he captained the side in his first match. He made his Auckland debut in the same year.

Taavao was a member of the Blues wider training group in 2011. He was a member of the full Blues squad from the 2012 until the 2015.

2016–2018

Taavao signed a two-year contract for the Waratahs and Sydney Rays for 2016 through 2017. Taavao signed for the Chiefs for the 2018 Super Rugby season and became a regular starter for them early in the season, with established All Blacks Nepo Laulala and Atunaisa Moli ruled out with serious injuries. Taavao was one of the best-performing players in the Chiefs during 2018 and was called into the All Blacks, as injury cover for Crusaders prop, Joe Moody.

Taavao made his international debut for New Zealand on 29 September 2018, during the fifth round of the 2018 Rugby Championship, against Argentina's Los Pumas, at Buenos Aires. Taavao replaced Blues prop, Ofa Tuungafasi, off the bench in the 51st minute and had a good impact off the bench, contributing towards a highly dominant scrum. The All Blacks beat Los Pumas 35–17, winning the Rugby Championship in the process. Taavao then made two more appearances for New Zealand on their end-of-season tour, including a start in a 69–31 win over Japan.

2019
With Tim Perry not considered for selection due to injury, Taavao was named in New Zealand's squad for the 2019 Rugby Championship. After a start against Argentina and appearing as a substitute against South Africa, as well as the record 26–47 defeat to Australia, Taavao established himself as a regular replacement off the bench for New Zealand, alongside Auckland teammate, Ofa Tuungafasi.

On 28 August, All Blacks Head Coach, Steve Hansen named Taavao as one of 31 players in New Zealand's squad for the 2019 Rugby World Cup. With 108-test veteran, Owen Franks missing out on the squad entirely, Taavao's selection received widespread news coverage. Franks claimed that Taavao, as well as Nepo Laulala, "deserve their places in the World Cup squad".

Taavao played in all of New Zealand's tests during the competition, starting in a 63–0 victory over Canada, also scoring his first try for New Zealand in a 71–9 win over Namibia. Having proved himself as a star performer for the All Blacks, Taavao also came off the bench in all three knockout tests of the World Cup, with New Zealand beating Wales 40–17 in the Bronze Final, claiming third place.

References

External links
 

1990 births
New Zealand rugby union players
New Zealand people of Australian descent
New Zealand sportspeople of Samoan descent
Blues (Super Rugby) players
Auckland rugby union players
Taranaki rugby union players
Rugby union props
Rugby union players from Auckland
Living people
New South Wales Waratahs players
New Zealand international rugby union players
Chiefs (rugby union) players
People educated at Dilworth School
Sydney (NRC team) players